Andreas Fischbacher (born 30 October 1973) is an Austrian ski mountaineer.

Fischbacher was born in Ramsau am Dachstein. He started ski mountaineering in 1998.

Selected results 
 2000
 1st, Hochwurzen-Berglauf
 2008:
 1st, Rofan Xtreme team (together with Andreas Ringhofer and Johann Wieland)
 5th, World Championship relay race (together with Martin Bader, Andreas Kalß and Alexander Lugger)

External links 
 Andreas Fischbacher at skimountaineering.org

1973 births
Living people
Austrian male ski mountaineers
People from Liezen District
Sportspeople from Styria